Laurent Bavay (born March 2, 1972) is a Belgian Egyptologist who has been director of the Institut français d'archéologie orientale since June 2015.

References

Belgian archaeologists
Belgian Egyptologists
Members of the Institut Français d'Archéologie Orientale
Living people
1972 births
Place of birth missing (living people)